A conveyor belt furnace is a furnace that uses a conveyor or a belt to carry process parts or material through the primary heating chamber for rapid thermal processing. It is designed for fast drying and curing of products and is nowadays widely used in the firing process of thick film and metallization process of solar cell manufacturing. Other names for conveyor belt furnace include metallization furnace, belt furnace, atmosphere furnace, infrared furnace and fast fire furnace.

Usually, a conveyor furnace adopts a tunnel structure and is composed of multiple controlled zones which include zones for preheating, binder burn out, heating, firing, and cooling. A conveyor furnace also features fast thermal responses, uniform and stable temperature distribution; it can heat treated parts to around 1050 °C. Belt speed of a conveyor furnace can be up to 6000mm/min. Products are heated efficiently by infrared radiation (it can also be ceramic heaters or IR lamps) and are dried and fired after passing through the controlled zones, followed by rapid cooling.

Process applications

Thick film processing 
After a paste is screened onto a substrate and it settles for 5–15 minutes at room temperature, it undergoes oven drying at 100-150 °C for 10–15 minutes to remove solvents. Firing is then completed in conveyor belt furnaces at temperatures between 500 and 1000 °C.

Crystalline silicon solar cell Manufacturing 
Electrical contacts are usually formed by screen printing. The firing is done in conveyor belt furnaces at a temperature of about 700 °C for a few minutes. Upon firing, the organic solvents evaporate and the metal powder becomes a conducting path for the electric current.

Thin film solar cell manufacturing
A transparent conducting glass, coated with doped SnO2 or ITO film, is used as a substrate. A thin film, such as CdS, is then deposited through CSS or CBD techniques. The CdS film is heat treated by a conveyor belt furnace in a reducing atmosphere or in the presence of CdCl2 at 400-500 °C.

Dye-sensitized solar cell (DSSC) manufacturing
TiO2 nanoparticles have been used extensively to increase the interfacial surface area in dye-sensitized solar cells. Nanoparticle films are generally made by screen printing a paste of titania nanocrystals and then sintering the particles together at 450-500 °C in a conveyor belt furnace.

References 

Industrial furnaces